Roberto "Obet" Mamangon Pagdanganan (born July 19, 1946, in Calumpit, Bulacan, Philippines) is a Filipino politician who served as the 29th Governor of Bulacan from 1988 to 1998.

Personal life
Robert Pagdanganan was born to former councillor Juan T. Pagdanganan, Jr. (now deceased) and Mrs Rosalina Mamangon Pagdanganan. He is the brother of former Calumpit, Bulacan mayor Ramon Pagdanganan (1953–2008). He is married to the former Susana Oblefias of Sariaya, Quezon who is a governor of the Philippine National Red Cross and Central Board Member of the Girl Scouts of the Philippines. They have two children, Maria Rossana (married to Michael Allan Sicat) who is a former senior manager at Unilever PRC who now have three children. They have a younger son Roberto Raymond. Roberto Raymond was also a politician, he ran for Vice-governor of Bulacan in 2004. Raymond died in 2007 in a car accident on the MacArthur Highway, in Malolos City, Bulacan.

Career

Political career
Roberto "Obet" Pagdanganan, is the President of the Foundation for Local Autonomy and Good Governance, Inc. (FLAGG), an NGO dedicated to pursue equitable and sustainable national progress through genuine local autonomy, good governance and quality education. He is Chairman of the National Cooperative Movement (NCM) which supports the development of cooperatives and the small and medium enterprises (SMEs). He is also vice-chairman of the National Real Estate Association (NREA), and a member of the National Executive Board of the Boy Scouts of the Philippines (BSP) where he was a two-term National President in 1996 to 1998 and 2019 to the present. He holds two other posts in the government as presidential adviser on cooperatives and chairman of the board of part-time professor at the Manuel L. Quezon University (15 years) and Pamantasan ng Lungsod ng Maynila (3 years), before he became OIC Governor of Bulacan from March 1986 to December 1987. He was elected unopposed (the first) as Provincial Governor of Bulacan in January 1988 and was thereafter re-elected twice in 1992 and in 1995. In the latter election, Pagdanganan won against actor and comedian Bert "Tawa" Marcelo, who had the support of people from the entertainment industry such as Fernando Poe Jr. and Pilita Corrales.

In 1998, he ran as a candidate for the Presidential nomination of Lakas-CMD but later lost to House Speaker Jose de Venecia during the national convention, he was later included as one of the candidates of the party for the 1998 Senatorial Elections where he placed in the 13th spot. In 2001, he ran again as senator during the Midterm elections under the People Power Coalition but later lost.

Obet Pagdanganan also hosts regular radio programs: "Lingkod ng Bayan" at GMA Super Radyo DZBB, 594 kHz every Saturday, 11 am to noon; "Obet P. sa IZ" at DWIZ, 882 kHz every Saturday, 5 to 6 pm; "Yagyagan sa Bantay Radyo" at DYDD Cebu City, every Saturday, 9 pm to 10 pm; and "Obet n' Action sa Aksyon Radyo", DXGO Davao City every Sunday, 7 am to 8 am. He has published papers on Business and Local Government Partnership for National Progress, development of SME's and cooperatives, and local governance. He is the author of the book "A Call for Cooperative Revolution".

After Pagdanganan lost the 2007 Bulacan Gubernatorial race, his brother, Ramon "Monching," who also lost the Calumpit mayoralty race, was gunned down on May 4, 2008, in Calumpit. The Philippine National Police (PNP) ordered full security for Roberto Pagdanganan.

On October 15, 2009, the Supreme Court of the Philippines allowed the Commission on Elections to proceed with the election protest for the gubernatorial position in Bulacan of Roberto M. Pagdanganan against Joselito R. Mendoza.

On December 1, 2009, the Commission on Elections proclaimed Roberto Pagdanganan as the rightful governor of the province of Bulacan.

As a new member of the Nacionalista Party, Pagdanganan ran for congressman for the 1st district of Bulacan in the 2010 but lost to incumbent Ma. Victoria Sy-Alvarado.

Government positions
This is a partial list of government offices handled by Roberto Pagdanganan:
Governor, Province of Bulacan, 1988–1998
National President, League Of Provinces of the Philippines, 1990–1998
National President, Boy Scouts of the Philippines, 1995–1997
Secretary, Department of Agrarian Reform(Philippines) January 20, 2003 – January 20, 2004
Secretary, Department of Tourism (Philippines) February 2004-September 2004
Chairman and President, Philippine International Trading Corporation, September 2004 - March 2007
Chairman, Philippine Southeast Asian Games Organizing Committee (PhilSOC), 2004–2005

Education
Obet Pagdanganan holds the following educational qualifications.
Doctorate in educational management (honoris causa), Bulacan State University (1995);
Master in Business Administration, Dela Salle University (1981);
Bachelor of Laws, Manuel L. Quezon University (1990);
Bachelor of Science in chemical engineering (1968), where he is the only summa cum laude to date in the School of Engineering, 11th Placer, Chemical Engineering Board Examinations (July, 1968);
Calumpit Institute (now Colegio de Calumpit Inc.), valedictorian (1963);
Calumpit Elementary School (also Caniogan Elementary School), valedictorian (1959)

Pagdanganan was among the record 6,533 law graduates who took the September 2008 Philippine Bar Examination.

In media
Pagdanganan was cast as Deodato Arellano, the Supremo of the Katipunan, in the 1996 film Tirad Pass: The Last Stand of Gen. Gregorio del Pilar.
His life story was made into a film in 1997 entitled Ilaban Mo, Bayan Ko: The Obet Pagdanganan Story starring Joel Torre.

References
Office of the President Profile :: The Honorable Roberto M. Pagdanganan
Department of Agrarian Reform Program, Republic of the Philippines

Notes

External links
Office of the President Profile :: The Honorable Roberto M. Pagdanganan

1946 births
Living people
Arroyo administration cabinet members
De La Salle University alumni
Filipino Roman Catholics
Governors of Bulacan
Lakas–CMD (1991) politicians
Lakas–CMD politicians
Manuel L. Quezon University alumni
Nacionalista Party politicians
People from Bulacan
Secretaries of Agrarian Reform of the Philippines
Secretaries of Tourism of the Philippines